Mountain Park Dam (National ID # OK20502) is located just upstream of Snyder Dam, on Otter Creek near Mountain Park, Oklahoma. Snyder Lake was drained to accommodate construction of Mountain Park Dam, then restored upon completion of construction, which was performed by O'Neal Construction, Inc. of Ann Arbor, MI.  The lake is maintained at sufficient elevation to provide a plunge pool for water released or spilled from the dam. Mountain Park dam impounds the waters of Tom Steed Reservoir.

The outlet works for Mountain Park Dam are in the left thrust block and include three outlet pipes, trashracks, fish screens, emergency and operating slide gates, and motor-operated gate hoists. A 42-inch-diameter, joint-use outlet pipe is provided to release water into the aqueduct system; an 84-inch-diameter flood outlet pipe and a 15-inch-diameter river outlet pipe are provided to release floodwater and small streamflows. The joint-use outlet to the aqueduct system contains two gated intakes at elevations 1382.0 and 1401.0 to permit selection of the level of the reservoir from which water is to be withdrawn; water from both levels may be mixed. This outlet also is provided with fish screens.

The concrete arch portion of Mountain Park Dam functions as an uncontrolled, overflow spillway. Concrete piers and training walls at each end of the spillway direct floodwater into and over the crest. Floodwaters fall into a plunge pool energy dissipater at the toe of the dam.

References 
 Mountain Park Project, U.S. Bureau of Reclamation

Dams in Oklahoma
Buildings and structures in Kiowa County, Oklahoma
United States Bureau of Reclamation dams
Dams completed in 1975